Dracula benedictii is a species of orchid found in Cordillera Central and Cordillera Occidental,  Colombia. It was named in honour of Benedict Roezl the noted Bohemian collector, who discovered this species.

References

External links

benedictii
Orchids of Colombia
Plants described in 1874